The Piano Quintet No. 1 in A minor, Op. 30, was composed by the French composer Louise Farrenc in 1839.

Instrumentation
This work is scored for piano, violin, viola, cello & double bass.

Movements
This piece adheres to the standard 4-movement form: 
Allegro (in A minor and in sonata form, ends in A major)
Adagio non troppo (in E major and in "ABACABA" form with an additional coda)
Scherzo (Presto) (in A minor and in ternary form, with a "trio" section in A major)
Finale (Allegro) (in A minor and in sonata form)

See also
Piano Quintet No. 2 (Farrenc)

External links

Farrenc
Compositions in A minor
1839 compositions
Compositions by Louise Farrenc